Chyliński - is a Polish coat of arms. It was used by several szlachta families.

History

Blazon

Notable bearers

Notable bearers of this coat of arms include:

Related coats of arms 
 Jastrzębiec coat of arms

See also 
 Polish heraldry
 Heraldic family
 List of Polish nobility coats of arms

Bibliography
 Juliusz Ostrowski, Księga herbowa rodów polskich. Warszawa 1897–1914.

External links 
 Ornatowski.com 

Polish coats of arms